Scopula hesycha is a moth of the family Geometridae. It is found in Central China.

References

Moths described in 1919
hesycha
Moths of Asia